East Melbourne is an inner-city suburb in Melbourne, Victoria, Australia,  east of Melbourne's Central Business District, located within the City of Melbourne local government area. East Melbourne recorded a population of 4,896 at the 2021 census.

East Melbourne is a small area of inner Melbourne, located between Richmond and the Central Business District. Broadly, it is bounded by Spring Street, Victoria Parade, Punt Road/Hoddle Street and Brunton Avenue.

One of Melbourne's earliest suburbs, East Melbourne has long been home to many significant government, health and religious institutions, including the Parliament of Victoria and offices of the Victoria State Government in the Parliamentary and Cathedral precincts, which are located on a gentle hill at the edge of the Melbourne's Hoddle Grid, known as Eastern Hill. The world-famous Melbourne Cricket Ground (MCG) is located in Yarra Park, in the East Melbourne locality of Jolimont. East Melbourne has been affluent since its first establishment and contains some of the oldest Victorian homes and terrace houses and parks and gardens in Melbourne.

Geography

The Parliamentary and Cathedral precincts are located on a gentle hill, known as Eastern Hill. Jolimont railway station is at the top of a ridge, which extends towards Bridge Road in Richmond, from which Jolimont slopes downwards towards the Yarra River and the residential section to the north slopes gradually towards the flatter areas of Fitzroy and Collingwood to the north and Richmond to the south.

History

East Melbourne was one of Melbourne's earliest suburbs. It was first planned in 1837 by surveyor Robert Hoddle, but was not actually settled until 1840, some time after neighbouring Fitzroy and Collingwood. Among the first settlers was Charles La Trobe, who built a transportable dwelling in 1840 and wealthy professionals followed, establishing mansions there. The plan of the alignment of streets was adopted in July 1849.

In the 1960s and 1970s, while other inner-city suburbs were experiencing gentrification, East Melbourne, traditionally a blue ribbon district, experienced a temporary decline. Flats began to appear and replace many of the old mansions. Many remaining mansions had been converted to rooming houses over the years. The construction of the Hilton Hotel saw the demolition of Cliveden mansions, a five-storey Victorian era terrace and the largest mansion in Melbourne (a small section of the panelling, doors and other decoration of the ballroom is retained in the formal restaurant of the Hilton). Office development and expansion of the hospitals in the area affected much of the area surrounding Victoria Parade.

During the 1990s East Melbourne once again experienced a sharp increase in property prices. The Becton development at Jolimont, modelled on a picturesque Georgian village, created one of inner-city Melbourne's first exclusive enclaves. Many of the remaining mansions and terraces were placed on heritage registers and subdivided into apartments. Later the Victoria Brewery was also converted into exclusive apartments, named "TriBeCa", after the Manhattan neighbourhood.

East Melbourne's proximity to the city, its small size and its relatively unspoilt streetscapes ensure its property is expensive and highly sought after.

Population

At the 2016 census, East Melbourne had a population of 4,964. 62.8% of people were born in Australia. The next most common countries of birth were England 4.2% and New Zealand 3.0%. 75.0% of people only spoke English at home. The most common responses for religion were No Religion 42.8% and Catholic 18.3%.

Local landmarks

Public and institutional buildings

East Melbourne is home to many famous Melbourne landmarks.

Treasury Place is notable for its government buildings on Spring Street, including Parliament House of Victoria (built in 1856 to the design of Peter Kerr) and the old Treasury Building (built in 1857 to the design of John James Clark). Treasury Place forms Australia's finest Renaissance revival streetscape, combining the facades of the Premier's Department and Treasury, State Offices, now occupied by the Education Department, the former Government Printing Office and Commonwealth Government Offices (built 1912–1914 to the design of John Smith Murdoch), all overlooking the Treasury Gardens. The rear of these offices is a feature of St Andrews Place.

Religious buildings

Nearby Cathedral Place is home to St Patrick's Cathedral, Catholic Theological College and many other former religious buildings now serving mixed use.

The former Baptist Church House, built between 1859 and 1863, although substantially modified during conversion into an office building, is one of the finer classical styled buildings in East Melbourne and was designed by Thomas Watts.

On the corner of Hotham and Powlett Streets, the large Cairns Memorial Presbyterian Church, which was built in the 1880s was subject to an innovative apartment conversion after the church was gutted by fire in 1988, leaving only the exterior sandstone shell.

Commercial buildings

Other notable buildings include the Arts & Crafts style of the Victorian Artists Society (1892) by Richard Speight and Harry Tompkins, the Eastern Hill Fire Station (1893) and the East Melbourne Synagogue (1877) by Crouch & Wilson.

Orica House, built on the edge of the Melbourne CBD on Nicholson Street between 1955 and 1958 and designed by Bates, Smart & McCutcheon, is notable as being one of the first curtain wall glass skyscrapers in the world and the first skyscraper to break Melbourne's strict height limits. Until 1961, it was also Australia's tallest building.

The Dallas Brooks Hall, one of Australia's finest examples of the "stripped classical" style, was completed in 1969 and has served as a major events venue for many years. The building caused controversy after 2001 when it owners, Freemasons Victoria announced that it was to be sold and demolished to make way for multi-purpose commercial development. Despite the building's architectural and cultural significance, its heritage protection status remains unknown. The building has since been demolished and is home to the Eastbourne Apartments.

Victoria Brewery (1882), between Albert and Victoria Streets, is notable as an early work of William Pitt. Its castellated facade has since been partially restored and converted into the TriBeCa apartments.

Housing

East Melbourne is home to some of Melbourne's earliest houses. While notable terrace housing is predominant in the area, the suburb also has some fine remnant mansions, the oldest and largest in East Melbourne being the blue stone colonial mansion Bishopscourt (designed by Newson & Blackburn), which dates back to 1853, was used as Victoria's Government House in 1874–1876 and has been the residence for all of Melbourne's Anglican Bishops and Archbishops since its completion. It is on the Victorian Heritage Register. The two-storey house at 157 Hotham Street, built in 1861, is notable as a rare example of bluestone gothic applied to residential architecture. The house is often attributed to Joseph Reed and considered one of his early residential works. Accordingly, it is also listed on the Victorian Heritage Register.

Several terrace houses are notable, including Tasma Terrace (1878), by architect Charles Webb, arguably Melbourne's finest terrace home and headquarters of the National Trust in Victoria, Clarendon (the home of the Her Place Women's Museum), East Melbourne Terrace, Annerley in George Street and Cypress Terrace (1867) in Hotham Street.

The large Queen Anne styled townhouse building known as Queen Bess Row is also notable. Completed in 1887 and designed by architect firm Tappin, Gilbert and Dennehy, this impressive red brick building dominates a main residential corner. Another landmark is Eastbourne Terrace, an eclectic Edwardian terrace, on the corner of Simpson Street and Wellington Parade.

East Melbourne is also characterised by Art Deco houses and apartment buildings. One unique example of the architectural legacy is the 'Dorijo' apartment building, located at 458 Victoria Parade. Designed by the distinctive hands of architect I.G Anderson in 1934, Dorijo's significant aspects include a reduction in the size of the three balconies that progress up the facade of the building structure and the unmistakable tower at the top of the building, with links to his other, more controversial site, Lonsdale House.

In the 12-month period to January 2020 East Melbourne reported a median house price of A$820,000 for a two bedroom unit.

Parks and public spaces

East Melbourne has many impressive Victorian era gardens with well established plantings, the largest of which are the Treasury Gardens and the Fitzroy Gardens. Yarra Park in Jolimont is used for picnicking and, controversially, car parking for the MCG. Parliament Gardens, a small square with a fountain adjacent to Parliament House, was granted public space by the City of Melbourne in 1934 and a modern fountain feature was later constructed.

Education
Historically, East Melbourne was also the original home to a number of prominent Melbourne's schools including: Scotch College, St Patrick's College, St Kevin's College, Catholic Ladies College, Presbyterian Ladies' College and Parade College. Catholic Theological College is currently located in the former Parade College building.

Notable residents
 George Jameson Johnston (1868–1949), soldier, administrator and businessman, was born on 24 October 1868 in East Melbourne, son of Charles Johnston from Cork, Ireland, and his English-born wife Elizabeth, née Jameson. Johnston volunteered for active service in the South African War and was attached to the 62nd Battery, Royal Field Artillery, as a special service officer. He left Australia in November 1899 as a captain and was promoted major in March 1900. He served at Modder River, did regimental duty with the 62nd Battery as a section commander, and saw action at Klip Drift, Paardeberg and Osfontein before the march on Bloemfontein; he was then attached to a howitzer brigade with the Royal Field Artillery before being invalided home with fever in July 1900.
 Jemima Montag (born 1998), female racewalker
 Robert Ramsay, lawyer and politician
 Frederick Romberg, architect
 Ernest O'Ferrall, journalist and writer
 Ada Plante, artist
 Emma Carney World Champion, Sport Australia Hall of Fame Inductee, Athlete Member

Transport

East Melbourne is served by major tramlines on Wellington Parade and Victoria Parade, both connecting with the CBD in the western edge of the suburb.

East Melbourne is also served by rail, with two main stations, Parliament underground station on Spring Street (part of the City Loop that runs underneath Melbourne) and Jolimont, on the Hurstbridge and Mernda lines, which is used primarily by patrons attending events at the MCG.

Punt Road and Hoddle Street, both on the suburb's eastern boundary, is a major road for bus routes in the area.

Health

Due to its proximity to a number of hospitals, many medical practitioners also have their rooms in East Melbourne. These hospitals include the Royal Victorian Eye and Ear Hospital (RVEEH), the Peter MacCallum Cancer Centre and the Freemasons' Hospital.

In addition, St Vincent's Hospital and St Vincent's Private Hospital Melbourne are located in adjacent Fitzroy, after relocating from their original site in East Melbourne.

Localities within East Melbourne

Jolimont is a locality within the suburb of East Melbourne.

Jolimont only covers a very small area. Most of it is occupied by the Melbourne Cricket Ground and surrounding Yarra Park and has its own railway station. The remainder of Jolimont is made up by a single block of housing, consisting of many Victorian terrace houses and office buildings.

The first superintendent of the Port Phillip District, and later lieutenant-governor, Charles La Trobe, lived in Jolimont with his family in a pre-fabricated cottage. The La Trobe's Cottage was moved in 1963 to the Kings Domain, where it is open to the public. Other notable people who have lived in Jolimont include William Guilfoyle.

References

External links
The Johnston Collection: a Fine and Decorative Arts Museum
Melbourne Cricket Ground
Australian Places – East Melbourne

 
Suburbs of Melbourne
Suburbs of the City of Melbourne (LGA)